Periegops is a genus of spiders with six eyes instead of the usual eight. It is the only genus in its family (Periegopidae) and has three described species. It was long considered to be members of Sicariidae or Segestriidae until Raymond Forster elevated them to the family level in 1995.

Taxonomy 
Periegops was first described in 1893 by Eugene Simon from a specimen of P. hirsutus (A synonym of P. suterii).

Description 
This genus of spider has only six eyes, as opposed to eight, which is typical for spiders. Body length varies from 5.9mm to 10mm depending on species and sex. Carapace is an orange colour and is darker on the anterior side. Abdomen is brown or creamy brown and usually have a chevron pattern. The family can be distinguished by the pattern of eye positions, which are in three clusters of two eyes.

Species
, the World Spider Catalog accepts the following species:
Periegops Simon, 1893
Periegops australia Forster, 1995 — Australia (Queensland)
 Periegops keani Vink, Dupérré & Malumbres-Olarte, 2013 — New Zealand (North Island)
 Periegops suterii (Urquhart, 1892) — New Zealand (South Island)

Habitat 
Periegops occur in forest habitat, where there are deep leaf litter layers and well drained soil.

Behaviour 
No Periegops species has been observed creating webs for prey capture, but rather has been observed using silk to create drag lines and silk retreats. Periegops are likely all fast moving, nocturnal hunters.

In P. suterii, females have been found with two to three males with them, which may imply that the female has a way of attracting males to them.

References

External links

 Periegops suteri (PDF, p16, with picture)
  (2014): The world spider catalog, version 14.5. American Museum of Natural History. 

Spiders of Australia
Spiders of New Zealand
Araneomorphae genera
Periegopidae